This article provides an incomplete list of novels set in Stockholm. Included is the date of first publication.

Nineteenth century

1830s
 Det går an – Carl Jonas Love Almqvist (1839)

1870s
 The Red Room – August Strindberg (1879)

1880s
 The Son of a Servant – August Strindberg (1886)

1890s
 Förvillelser – Hjalmar Söderberg (1895)

Twentieth century

1900s
 Martin Birck's Youth – Hjalmar Söderberg (1901)
 Alone – August Strindberg (1903)
 Doctor Glas – Hjalmar Söderberg (1905)
 Norrtullsligan – Elin Wägner (1908)

1910s
 The Serious Game – Hjalmar Söderberg (1912)
 The Emperor of Portugallia – Selma Lagerlöf (1914)

1920s

1930s
 England Made Me – Graham Greene (1935)
 Kungsgatan – Ivar Lo-Johansson (1935)
 Sömnlös – Vilhelm Moberg (1937)

1940s
 Grupp Krilon – Eyvind Johnson (1941)
 Krilons resa – Eyvind Johnson (1942)
 Krilon själv – Eyvind Johnson (1943)

1950s

1960s
 City of My Dreams – Per Anders Fogelström (1960)
 Children of Their City – Per Anders Fogelström (1962)
 The Prize – Irving Wallace (1962)
 Remember the City – Per Anders Fogelström (1964)
 The Story of a Crime (novel series) – Maj Sjöwall and Per Wahlöö (1965–1975)
 In a City Transformed – Per Anders Fogelström (1966)
 Stad i världen – Per Anders Fogelström (1968)

1970s
 Attila – Klas Östergren (1975)
 The Aesthetics of Resistance – Peter Weiss (1975)
 Jack – Ulf Lundell (1976)
 Fantomerna – Klas Östergren (1978)

1980s
 Gentlemen – Klas Östergren (1980)
 Evil – Jan Guillou (1981)
 Fattiga riddare och stora svenskar – Klas Östergren (1983)

1990s

Twenty-first century

2000s
 Ett öga rött – Jonas Hassen Khemiri (2003)
 Gregorius – Bengt Ohlsson (2004)
 Millennium (novel series) – Stieg Larsson (2005–2007)
 Gangsters – Klas Östergren (2005)
 Easy Money – Jens Lapidus (2006)
 Never Screw Up – Jens Lapidus (2008)
 Den sista cigaretten – Klas Östergren (2009)

2010s
 Life Deluxe – Jens Lapidus (2011)
 Torka aldrig tårar utan handskar: Kärleken – Jonas Gardell (2012)
 Wilful Disregard – Lena Andersson (2013)
 Torka aldrig tårar utan handskar: Sjukdomen – Jonas Gardell (2013)
 Torka aldrig tårar utan handskar: Döden – Jonas Gardell (2013)
 Utan personligt ansvar – Lena Andersson (2014)
 Twist – Klas Östergren (2014)

Stockholm
Stockholm in popular culture
Stockholm
Stockholm-related lists
 
Stockholm Novels